Bostancı is a village in the Silopi district of Şırnak Province in Turkey. The village is populated by Kurds of the Sipêrtî and Tayan tribes and had a population of 2,405 in 2021.

The hamlets of Güven and Mağra are attached to Bostancı.

References 

Villages in Silopi District
Kurdish settlements in Şırnak Province